Janis Rodmanis (born 25 December 1947) is a Chilean rower. He competed in the men's single sculls event at the 1972 Summer Olympics.

References

1947 births
Living people
Chilean male rowers
Olympic rowers of Chile
Rowers at the 1972 Summer Olympics
Place of birth missing (living people)